El Biar (from Arabic "الأبيار", meaning "The Wells") is a suburb of Algiers, Algeria. It is located in the administrative constituency of Bouzaréah in the Algiers Province. As of the 1998 census, it has a population of 52,582 inhabitants. The suburb's postal code is 16030 and its municipal code is 1610.

Buildings
 Villa Susini

Notable people

 René Aleman (1913–1989), French weightlifter
 Khalil Boukedjane, football player
 Abdelaziz Bouteflika (1937–2021), 5th President of Algeria (1999–2019)
 Saïd Bouteflika, Algerian politician and academic, brother of Abdelaziz Bouteflika
 Eldridge Cleaver (1935–1998), civil rights leader & author
 Jacques Derrida (1930–2004), philosopher
 Dahmane El Harrachi, chaabi singer
 Marcelle Laloë, (1884-1974), wife of Hàm Nghi
 Hàm Nghi, eighth Emperor of the Vietnamese Nguyễn Dynasty
 Mohamed Hamdoud, football player
 Tarek Lazizi, retired football player
 Djamel Menad, retired football player
 Lahcène Nazef, football player
 Abderrahmane Nekli, diplomat
 Issam Nima, long jumper
 Georges Rochegrosse, French painter
 Rouiched, actor and comedian
 Abderrahmane Soukhane, retired football player
 Moïse Tshombe, Congolese politician put under house arrest

Government and infrastructure
The Transport Ministry has its head office in El Biar.

References

External links
  Ministry of Energy and Mining

Suburbs of Algiers
Communes of Algiers Province
Algiers Province